William Browning Spencer (born 1946) is an American novelist and short story writer living in Austin, Texas. His science fiction and horror stories are often darkly and surrealistically humorous.

Awards and honors

His novel Résumé With Monsters won the International Horror Critics Guild Award for Best Novel in 1995. His first novel, Maybe I'll Call Anna, was a National Endowment of the Arts New American Writing Award winner. His novels and short stories have been finalists for the Bram Stoker Award, the World Fantasy Award, and the Shirley Jackson Award. His short stories have been anthologized numerous times, including twice in The Year's Best Fantasy and Horror and twice in The Year's Best Science Fiction. In 1995, he was Toastmaster of ArmadilloCon 21 in Austin, TX.

Bibliography

Novels 
Maybe I'll Call Anna, Permanent Press (1990)
Résumé With Monsters, Permanent Press (1995). Reprint: Dover Publications (2014)
Zod Wallop. St. Martin's Press (1995). Reprint: White Wolf Publishing (1996)
Irrational Fears, White Wolf Publishing (1998)

Short fiction

Collections
The Return of Count Electric & Other Stories, Permanent Press (1993)
The Ocean and All Its Devices, Subterranean Press (2006)
The Unorthodox Dr. Draper And Other Stories, Subterranean Press (2017)

List of short stories

References

External links
Book group recount of an evening with William Browning Spencer
Interview from 1999 at "Crescent Blues"
Fantastic Fiction summary for William Browning Spencer
Publishers Weekly review of Maybe I'll Call Anna 
Publishers Weekly review of The Return of Count Electric & Other Stories 
Washington Post review of Irrational Fears 
Publishers Weekly review of Irrational Fears 
Kirkus review of Zod Wallop 
New York Times Review of Zod Wallop
SF Site review of The Ocean and All Its Devices 
Publishers Weekly review of The Ocean and All Its Devices 
Publishers Weekly review of The Unorthodox Dr. Draper and Other Stories 
Kirkus review of The Unorthodox Dr. Draper and Other Stories 
Locus Magazine review of The Unorthodox Dr. Draper and Other Stories 
William Browning Spencer Internet Speculative Fiction Database 

20th-century American novelists
American horror writers
American male novelists
American science fiction writers
1946 births
Living people
American male short story writers
The Magazine of Fantasy & Science Fiction people
20th-century American short story writers
20th-century American male writers
Weird fiction writers